Jean Stafford (July 1, 1915 – March 26, 1979) was an American short story writer and novelist. She won the Pulitzer Prize for Fiction for The Collected Stories of Jean Stafford in 1970.

Biography
She was born in Covina, California, to Mary Ethel (McKillop) and John Richard Stafford, a Western pulp writer. As a youth Stafford attended the University of Colorado Boulder and, with friend James Robert Hightower, won a one-year fellowship to study philology at the University of Heidelberg from 1936 to 1937.

Her first novel, Boston Adventure, was a best-seller, earning her national acclaim. She wrote two more novels in her career, but her greatest medium was the short story: her works were published in The New Yorker and various literary magazines. In 1955 she won first place in the O. Henry Awards for her story In the Zoo. For the academic year 1964–1965, she was a Fellow on the faculty at the Center for Advanced Studies of Wesleyan University.

Stafford's personal life was often marked by unhappiness. She was married three times.  Her first marriage, to the brilliant but mentally unstable poet Robert Lowell in 1940, left her with lingering emotional and physical scars. She was seriously injured in an automobile accident with Lowell at the wheel in 1938, a trauma she described in one of her best-known stories, "The Interior Castle," and the disfigurement she suffered as a result was a turning point in her life. A second marriage to Life magazine staff writer Oliver Jensen also ended in divorce. Stafford enjoyed a brief period of domestic happiness with her third husband, A. J. Liebling, a prominent writer for The New Yorker. After his death in 1963, she nearly stopped writing fiction, though she continued to write non-fiction essays.

Death and legacy
For many years Stafford suffered from alcoholism, depression, and pulmonary disease. By age sixty-three she had almost stopped eating and died of cardiac arrest in White Plains, New York, in 1979. She was buried in Green River Cemetery, East Hampton, New York.

In The Elements of Style, E. B. White cites Stafford as an example of good prose: "Jean Stafford, to cite a modern author, demonstrates in her story 'In the Zoo' how prose is made vivid by the use of words and images that evoke sensations." 

Several biographies of Jean Stafford were written following her death, notably David Roberts' Jean Stafford: a Biography (1988), Charlotte Margolis Goodman's Jean Stafford: The Savage Heart (1990), and Ann Hulbert's The Interior Castle: The Art and Life of Jean Stafford (1992).

Works

 Boston Adventure, 1944 (novel)
 The Mountain Lion, 1947 (novel)
 The Catherine Wheel, 1952 (novel)
 Children Are Bored on Sunday, 1953 (short stories), includes "The Interior Castle" (1946)
 Prize Stories 1955: The O. Henry Awards, 1955 (short stories), includes "In the Zoo" (1955)
 A Book of Stories, 1957 (contributes five stories)
 Elephi: The Cat with the High I.Q., 1962 (juvenile)
 The Lion and the Carpenter and Other Tales from the Arabian Tales Retold, 1962 (juvenile)
 Bad Characters, 1964 (short stories)
 A Mother in History, 1966, a profile of Marguerite Oswald, mother of Lee Harvey Oswald
 Collected Stories, 1969

Adaptations
In 1952, Hope Chest was adapted into a 30 minute long film, starring Florence Bates.
In 1982, Stafford's short story The Scarlet Letter was adapted into a 30 minute long TV film, starring Christian Slater as Virgil Meade.

References

External links

 Jean Stafford at Internet Accuracy Project

 An Influx of Poets, a novel excerpt, Narrative Magazine, (Spring 2004).
 Articles in Western American Literature on Jean Stafford

1915 births
1979 deaths
20th-century American novelists
American women novelists
American women short story writers
O. Henry Award winners
Pulitzer Prize for Fiction winners
Alcohol-related deaths in New York (state)
People from East Hampton (town), New York
University of Colorado alumni
Wesleyan University faculty
20th-century American women writers
20th-century American short story writers
Writers from California
Novelists from New York (state)
Novelists from Connecticut
Burials at Green River Cemetery
American women academics
Members of the American Academy of Arts and Letters